Hit Trésor Sporting Club  is a professional basketball team that is based in Bangui, Central African Republic. Founded in 1962, they compete in the Central African League.

History
Hit Trésor won the FIBA Africa Clubs Champions Cup twice, in the years 1973 and 1976, and they competed at the 1975 edition of the Intercontinental Cup.

Honours
National Cup
Champions: 2014
FIBA Africa Clubs Champions Cup
Champions (2): 1973, 1978
Third place: 1975

References

External links
AfroBasket.com Team Page

Basketball teams in the Central African Republic
Basketball teams established in 1962
1962 establishments in Africa